André Pourny (30 November 1928 – 10 June 2018) was a French politician. He represented Saone-et-Loire in the Senate from 1986 to 2004 and was a member of The Republicans.

References

1928 births
2018 deaths
Senators of Saône-et-Loire
French Senators of the Fifth Republic